Events from the year 1974 in Taiwan, Republic of China. This year is numbered Minguo 63 according to the official Republic of China calendar.

Incumbents
 President – Chiang Kai-shek
 Vice President – Yen Chia-kan
 Premier – Chiang Ching-kuo
 Vice Premier – Hsu Ching-chung

Events

July
 20 July – The establishment of TKK Fried Chicken.

Births
 17 March – Kolas Yotaka, spokesperson of Executive Yuan
 2 May – Chang Chen-yue, singer
 28 May – Rosalia Wu, member of 9th Legislative Yuan
 19 July – Chen Ting-fei, member of 8th and 9th Legislative Yuan
 7 October – Alyssa Chia, actress
 19 October – Wang Ginn-wang, Minister of Coast Guard Administration (2006–2014)
 18 November – Hsieh Che-ching, writer
 25 December – Jeannie Hsieh, singer-songwriter, dancer, actress and model

References

 
Years of the 20th century in Taiwan